Yucca madrensis H. S. Gentry is a plant in the genus Yucca in the family Asparagaceae. It is native to a mountainous region in the Sierra Madre Occidental in the Mexican states of Sonora and Chihuahua. It has also been reported from Arizona  It grows on steep, rocky slopes in pine-oak forests.

Yucca madrensis has indehiscent fruits and serrate leaves. This suggests relationships with Y. rigida Trel. and Y. schottii Engelm. It differs from both those species by several characters such as narrowness of the leaves, glabrous inflorescence, and short stature.

References

madrensis
Flora of Arizona
Flora of Mexico
Flora of Sonora
Flora of Chihuahua (state)
Plants described in 1972